Kolgu is a village in Kuusalu Parish, Harju County in northern Estonia. It lies on the Valgejõgi River, just northwest of the town of Tapa.

References

Villages in Harju County